Mwingi South Constituency was a former electoral constituency in Kenya. It is one of the eight constituencies in the Kitui County and is now known as Mwingi Central.

The constituency was established for the 1997 elections and was one of two constituencies in the former Mwingi District.

Members of Parliament 

In 2011 Musila, who represented the constituency since its establishment in 1997, declared he would run for the Kitui senator seat.

Locations and wards

References

External links 
Mwingi South Constituency
Map of the constituency

Former constituencies of Kenya
Constituencies in Eastern Province (Kenya)
1997 establishments in Kenya
Constituencies established in 1997